Markovo is a rural locality (a village) in Chaykovsky, Perm Krai, Russia. The population was 94 as of 2010. There are 20 streets.

References 

Rural localities in Chaykovsky urban okrug